Ctenus exlineae is a species of wandering spider in the family Ctenidae. It is found in the United States.

References

External links

 

Ctenidae
Articles created by Qbugbot
Spiders described in 1981